ʾAbū l-ʿAbbās ʾAḥmad bin ʾAbī Yaʿqūb bin Ǧaʿfar bin Wahb bin Waḍīḥ al-Yaʿqūbī (died 897/8), commonly referred to simply by his nisba al-Yaʿqūbī, was an Arab Muslim geographer and perhaps the first historian of world culture in the Abbasid Caliphate.

Life 
He was born in Baghdad as the great-grandson of Wadih, the freedman of the caliph Al-Mansur. Until 873 he lived in Armenia and Khorasan, working under the patronage of the Tahirids Governors; then he traveled to India, Egypt and the Maghreb, and died in Egypt. He died in AH 284 (897/8).

His sympathies with Ahl al-Bayt are found throughout his works.

In 872, he listed the kingdoms of Bilād as-Sūdān, including Ghana, Gao, and Kanem.

Works 
 Ta'rikh ibn Wadih (Chronicle of Ibn Wadih)
 Kitab al-Buldan (Book of the Countries) - biology, contains a description of the Maghreb, with a full account of the larger cities and much topographical and political information (ed. M. de Goeje, Leiden, 1892).

Editions

Notes

References

External links 

9th-century births
897 deaths
Iraqi Shia Muslims
9th-century Arabic writers
9th-century historians from the Abbasid Caliphate
9th-century geographers
10th-century geographers
Geographers from the Abbasid Caliphate
Explorers of India
Travel writers of the medieval Islamic world